Intravitreal is a route of administration of a drug, or other substance, in which the substance is delivered into the vitreous humor of the eye. "Intravitreal" literally means "inside an eye". Intravitreal injections were first introduced in 1911 when Ohm gave an injection of air into the vitreous humor to repair a detached retina. In the mid-1940s, intravitreal injections became a standard way to administer drugs to treat endophthalmitis and cytomegalovirus retinitis.

Epidemiology 
Intravitreal injections were proposed over a century ago however the number performed remained relatively low until the mid 2000s. Until 2001, intravitreal injections were mainly used to treat end-ophthalmitis. The number of intravitreal injections stayed fairly constant, around 4,500 injections per year in the US. The number of injections tripled to 15,000 in 2002 when triamcinolone injections were first used to treat diabetic macular oedema. This use continued to drive an increase to 83,000 injections in 2004. In 2005 bevacizumab and ranibizumab intravitreal injections for the treatment of wet-AMD caused a rise in injections to 252,000. In 2008, over 1 million intravitreal injections were performed. This doubled to 2 million just 3 years later in 2011 when another anti-VEGF intravitreal injection aflibercept became available for the treatment of wet AMD. Intravitreal injections hit an all-time high in 2016 reaching over 5.9 million injections in the US.

Uses

Anti-Vascular Endothelial Growth Factor (anti-VEGF) 
The most common reason intravitreal injections are used is to administer anti-vascular endothelial growth factor (anti-VEGF) therapies to treat wet age related macular degeneration (AMD) and diabetic retinopathy. Both of these conditions cause damage to the retina leading to vision loss. There are three widely used Anti-VEGF drugs to treat these conditions: ranibizumab (Lucentis®; Genentech), bevacizumab (Avastin®; Genentech), and aflibercept (Eylea®; Regeneron Pharmaceuticals). Bevacizumab has not been FDA approved to treat wet AMD however in the US it is the first line anti-VEGF therapy for over half of ophthalmologists due to its efficacy and drastically lower cost.  These three drugs bind to VEGF molecules preventing them from binding to VEGF receptors on the surface of endothelial cells thereby stopping the abnormal angiogenesis that causes wet AMD.  All three of these therapies have vastly improved outcomes for sufferers who had limited treatment options prior to their invention but must be administered via intravitreal injection.

Steroids 
Steroids may be administered via intravitreal injection to treat diabetic and vasculo-occlusive macular edema, exudative macular degeneration, pseudophakic cystoid macular edema, and posterior uveitis. Common steroids used to treat these conditions include dexamethasone and triamcinolone acetonide (Triescence, Alcon Laboratories, Inc.). Steroid implants, such as the dexamethasone implant (Ozurdex, Allergan, Inc.), are used for long-term treatment of macular edema. Both of these steroid work by modulating inflammatory cytokines.

Adverse events and complications 
Endophthalmitis, or a bacterial infection within the eye causing inflammation of the sclera, is one of the most severe complications due to intravitreal injections. Incidence of endophthalmitis after intravitreal injection per patient has been reported to range from 0.019 to 1.6%. Endophthalmitis can also result in white or yellow discharge inside the eyelid, and a white, cloudy cornea. A layer of white blood cells called hypopyon may develop between the iris and the cornea. Endophthalmitis is considered an ophthalmological emergency and requires immediate treatment in many cases. It is treated with injections of antibiotics and antifungal compounds as appropriate. In severe cases a vitrectomy, or removal of vitreous humor, may be required to surgically remove infectious debris.

Another complication of intravitreal medication administration is inflammation. Intraocular inflammation is one of the main causes of temporary pain and vision loss after an intravitreal injection. Severe inflammation can cause permanent damage to the eye. The risk of inflammation varies based on the specific drug being administered. One clinical trial of ranibizumab for age-related macular degeneration administered intravitreally reported intraocular inflammation rates between 1.4% and 2.9%. Bevacizumab, another medication for the same purpose, resulted in an incidence between 0.09% and 0.4%.

Rhegmatogenous retinal detachment, when the retina breaks allowing vitreous fluid to leak into the subretinal space, resulting from intravitreal injection is rare, occurring at most in 0.67% of people. This fluid can cause sensory tissues to detach from the retina, thus losing their source of nutrition, and slowly killing the cells.

Subconjunctival hemorrhage is the most common type of hemorrhage following intravitreal injection with a reported incidence of nearly 10% of injections. People taking aspirin may be at higher risk for hemorrhage after intravitreal injection. Choroidal hemorrhage and subretinal hemorrhage are less common than subconjunctival hemorrhage, but both have been reported to occur following intravitreal injection.

At least one study has noted that up to 8.6% of intravitreal injections may be administered in the incorrect eye. Factors identified by Mimouni et al. in 2020 which may lead to a person identifying the wrong eye for self-administration include length of time since last injection and previous injections in both eyes.

Repeated injections 
Treatments administered via intravitreal injection are not cures and therefore repeated injections are necessary for managing conditions. For example, anti-VEGF therapies must be injected monthly or bi-monthly for the rest of their lives in order to treat wet age related macular degeneration. A growing body of evidence has shown repeat intravitreal injections have their own increased risks and complications.

A 3x rise in intraocular pressure after an intravitreal injection is expected and usually only lasts a few minutes. Studies have shown an increased risk of sustained elevated intraocular pressure due to repeated intravitreal injections. Elevated intraocular pressure leads to tissue damage, this is how glaucoma damages the eye. Many theories as to why this is have been postulated however many focus on the effect of the repeated eye trauma. The risk of elevated intraocular pressure is so great that it is recommended clinicians monitor intraocular pressure before and after intravitreal injection. Mount Sinai researchers have developed a method to measure retina damage from long term intravitreal injection using optimal coherence tomography angiography (OCTA). OCTA captures the motion of red blood cells in blood vessels noninvasively allowing researchers to measure blood flow in the macula and optic nerve. From this data they were able to show areas of cumulative damage.

Procedure and guidelines 
In 2004 with the rise of intravitreal injections, a group of experts established the first general guidelines for administering intravitreal injections. Until an update in 2014 these were consensus guidelines in the US. In 2014 a panel of 16 health professionals with expertise in different aspects of the injection reviewed and revised the original guidelines. Together they released areas of general agreement, areas with no clear consensus, and recommended sequence of steps for intravitreal injection.

Changes from 2004 Guidance

Dropped Recommendations from 2004 
Use of a lid speculum is no longer essential. Now a lid speculum, manual lid retraction or a similar maneuver can be used to keep the eyelids out of the way during the procedure.

The strong 2004 consensus that the pupil should be routinely dilated to examine the posterior segment of the eye post injection was dropped. Some of the 2014 panelists did not dilate the pupil for routine injections while others found this examination to be highly important. As no consensus was reached this recommendation was dropped from the 2014 guidance.

New Recommendations in 2014 
In 2004 the committee did not come to a consensus on routine use of pre-, peri- or postinjection antibiotics. Since then evidence has emerged suggesting that peri-injection antibiotics do not meaningfully lower the risk of post-injection infection and periodic multi-day administration of topical ophthalmic antibiotics facilitates the colonization of drug-resistant bacteria. For these reasons in 2014 the committee decided against recommending routine antibiotics.

The new guidelines include hand washing and glove use consistent with the modern-day medical practice of universal precautions. Although the use of gloves was agreed upon by the committee some panelists cited studies showing no impact of glove use on endophthalmitis rate.

In 2004, the topic of droplet contamination was not addressed. Since then new evidence has come to light showing that streptococcal species cause a disproportionate number of post intravitreal injection endophthalmitis cases compared to other forms of ocular surgery. This is likely due to aerosolized droplet contamination from either the practitioners’ or patients’ mouth. The 2014 guidelines were updated to address these findings recommending both clinicians and patients wear face masks during the procedure.

The new guidelines recommend monitoring intraocular pressure both pre- and post-injection. This recommendation stemmed from new evidence showing that routine intravitreal administration of anti-VEGF therapies may increase intraocular pressure for a sustained time period.

The 2014 guidelines addressed bilateral injections done in the same visit. The committee recommended treating each eye as a separate procedure and use different lots or batches of medication whenever possible. The panel was not able to support the use of sterile drapes in the procedure as retrospective studies showed no increased rate of endophthalmitis in injections done without drapes.

Potential alternatives 
Intravitreal injections have vastly improved outcomes for patients with retinal diseases however the risk and patient burden associated with repeated injections has prompted researchers to pursue less invasive methods of application. There has been significant emphasis on finding methods to administer treatments topically over the last 50 years. This research has garnered more attention thanks to the increase in intravitreal injections and the growing evidence linking repeat injections to adverse events.

See also
Eye drops

References

Medical treatments
Ophthalmic drug administration